"What Do I Care" is a song written and originally recorded by Johnny Cash.

It was issued on his first Columbia Records single (Columbia 4-41251, with "All Over Again" on the opposite side), released between September and November 1958.

"What Do I Care" reached #52 on the Billboard Hot 100 and #7 on the Billboard country chart, while "All Over Again" made it to #38 and #4, respectively.

Background

Charts

References 

Johnny Cash songs
1958 singles
Songs written by Johnny Cash
Sun Records singles
1958 songs